The 2013 American Le Mans Northeast Grand Prix was an auto racing event held at Lime Rock Park, Lakeville, Connecticut, on July 5–6, 2013, and was the fourth round of the 2013 American Le Mans Series season.  Muscle Milk Pickett Racing and their drivers Lucas Luhr and Klaus Graf earned their third consecutive victory of the season after Dyson Racing fell back.  Level 5 Motorsports' Scott Tucker and Ryan Briscoe overcame an incident with Extreme Speed Motorsports in the P2 category to take the victory, but were later penalized championship points for the maneuver.  RSR Racing earned their first victory in the PC class in 2013.  BMW's John Edwards and Dirk Müller won the GT category, while Flying Lizard Motorsports scored their first win in the GTC category.

Qualifying

Qualifying result
Pole position winners in each class are marked in bold.

  – The #17 Team Falken Tire Porsche was moved to the back of the grid for changing a tire between qualifying and the race.

Race

Race result
Class winners in bold.  Cars failing to complete 70% of their class winner's distance are marked as Not Classified (NC).

  – The #551 Level 5 HPD-Honda and #62 Risi Competizione Ferrari were both penalized with post-race stop and go penalties plus sixty seconds for avoidable contact.  The #551 was allowed to keep its finishing position in the race but its time penalty was applied in the awarding of championship points, demoting Level 5 to second place.

References

Northeast Grand Prix
Northeast Grand Prix
Northeast Grand Prix
Motorsport in Connecticut